The United States sanctions against Iran have had negative humanitarian impacts on Iranian society. Due to the broad nature of the sanctions, Iranians' right to health, education, and other human rights aspects have been adversely impacted. U.S. secondary sanctions have led to "over-compliance" by some companies. Sanctions have had an impact on people's life in addition to the availability of drugs. More people have reportedly died as a result of the sanctions than from the US-Iraq war in Iran.

Children with  epidermolysis bullosa, also known as butterfly kids, haemophilics and people with HIV disease are among the most affected vulnerable groups. U.S. sanctions have also hindered Iran's ability to combat the outbreak of the COVID-19 pandemic.

U.S. sanctions against Iran 

Since 1979, the United States has imposed various sanctions on economic, trade, scientific and military aspects against Iran. The U.S. sanctions against Iran include an embargo on dealings with the country by the U.S., and a ban on selling aircraft and repair parts to Iranian aviation companies.

Humanitarian aspects
The U.S. sanctions against Iran are accompanied by negative humanitarian impacts. According to international law, the United States must assess the impact of its sanctions on Iranians' rights and address any breaches caused by sanctions. Because of the vast network of US sanctions, banks and firms have withdrawn from humanitarian trade with Iran, leaving Iranians with rare or severe diseases unable to obtain the medicine and treatments needed.

According to Alena Douhan, the U.N. special rapporteur on unilateral coercive measures, the groups including "[people with] severe diseases, disabled people, Afghan refugees, women-led households and children" are adversely affected by the measures. She added that "sanctions have been substantially exacerbating the humanitarian situation in Iran."

Medical and pharmaceutical aspects
Pharmaceuticals and medical equipment do not fall under international sanctions, but Iran is facing shortages of drugs for the treatment of 30 illnesses—including cancer, heart and breathing problems, thalassemia and multiple sclerosis (MS)—because it is not allowed to use international payment systems. According to a survey by the Woodrow Wilson International Center for Scholars, drug imports to Iran from the United States and Europe declined by around 30% in 2012.

In 2013, the Guardian stated that over 85,000 cancer patients required rare forms of chemotherapy and radiotherapy. Western governments had established exemptions within the sanctions regime to ensure that vital medications could get through, but these exemptions were in conflict with blanket banking restrictions and limits on "dual-use" chemicals that may have both a medical and a military function.

Butterfly children

The epidermolysis bullosa (EB) is a severe and potentially fatal skin condition that causes excruciatingly painful wounds and is mostly seen in children, who are dubbed "butterfly kids" due to their delicate skin. The skin sores for those with EB becomes so painful that the patients often compare their skin to third-degree burns. Speaking to Aljazeera, an Iranian EB patient compared the pain with "boiling water, drop by drop falling on your skin." In spite of this, Mölnlycke Health Care, a Swedish company that manufactures, Mepilex absorbent foam dressing, the bandages that are said to be the most effective therapy for their condition, has decided to stop shipments to Iran due to fears about secondary sanctions as a result of over-compliance. The Iranian Centre for International Criminal Law (ICICL), based in The Hague, stated in 2021 that approximately 30 Iranian patients with EB —mostly children—have died since Mölnlycke ceased selling its wound dressing to Iran. In response to an inquiry by EB Home, an Iranian NGO that helped provide Iranian EB patients with the Swedish dressing, Molnlycke company stated in March 2019 that due to the U.S. sanctions it "decided not to conduct any business with relation to Iran for the time being".

On 19 December 2019, the Iranian ambassador to the UN, Majid Takht Ravanchi, addressed the UN Security Council and mentioned a two-year-old girl, Ava who died due to EB, in his remarks:

Haemophilia
Approximately 40,000 haemophilics were unable to obtain blood-clotting medications, and operations on haemophiliacs were effectively postponed due to the risks posed by the shortages. A haemophilic teenage boy died from his illness as a result of a pharmaceutical shortage caused by the sanctions.

HIV
An estimated 23,000 Iranians with HIV/AIDS had extremely limited access to the medications they require. The organization representing the 8,000 Iranians with thalassemia, an inherited blood disorder, reported that its members were starting to die given the lack of an essential medicine, deferoxamine, needed to regulate the iron content of the blood.
In addition, Iran was unable to purchase medical equipment such as autoclaves, which are required for the creation of numerous medications, since some of the largest Western pharmaceutical corporations declined to carry out business with the country.

During the COVID-19 pandemic
During the COVID-19 pandemic, China, the United Kingdom, the Group of 77, and experts urged the United States to ease sanctions on Iran to assist it in combating the increasing coronavirus outbreak. "There is no doubt that Iran’s capacity to respond to the novel coronavirus has been hampered by the Trump administration's economic sanctions, and the death toll is likely much higher than it would have been as a result," Center for Economic and Policy Research (CEPR) Co-director Mark Weisbrot said. He added that there was no doubt that the sanctions had hindered Iran's ability to contain the outbreak, resulting in more illnesses and potentially the virus' spreading outside the country's boundaries.

The management of the COVID-19 crisis in Iran was made more complicated as a result of the sanctions consequences. Human Rights Watch issued a statement on April 6, 2020 urging the US to ease sanctions against Iran so that Iran could have "access to crucial humanitarian resources during the [coronavirus] pandemic."  

Bloomberg reported in October 2020 that US sanctions had blocked the shipping of 2 million doses of influenza vaccination. The Red Crescent Society of Iran reported that the severe economic sanctions rendered the local Shahr Bank insolvent, thereby halting the vital cargo.

See also
Maximum pressure campaign

References

Sanctions against Iran
Human rights abuses
Economic problems
United States sanctions